This is a list of Bermudian first-class cricketers. First-class cricket matches are those between international teams or the highest standard of domestic teams in which teams have two innings each. Generally, matches are eleven players a side but there have been exceptions. Today, all matches must be scheduled to have at least three days' duration; historically, matches were played to a finish with no pre-defined timespan. This list is not limited to those who have played first-class cricket for Bermuda, and may include Bermudian players who played their first-class cricket elsewhere. The Bermuda cricket team played its maiden first-class match against a touring New Zealand team, in April 1972. The list is in alphabetical order.

See also
Bermudian cricket team
List of Bermudian ODI cricketers
First-class cricket

References

External links
Bermuda players at Cricket Archive

First-class